Jahmī was a pejorative term used by early Islamic scholars to refer to the followers of Jahm ibn Safwan (d. 128/746). The four schools of jurisprudence (fiqh) reject the Jahmi belief and the fourth Imam, Ahmad ibn Hanbal was persecuted by the Muslim ruler of the time for not accepting the Jahmi belief.

Representatives
Jahm ibn Safwan was born in Samarkand, first lived in Termez, and then in Kufa, where he met with Jad ibn Dirham, who became his follower and preacher of his ideas. Returning to his homeland, he took part in the uprising against the Umayyad governor of Khorasan and was captured and executed at Merv. Among the most famous preachers of Jahmitic views that can be noted was Bishra al-Marisi (d. 833). At the beginning of the 9th century Jahmites acted in Nehavend, but some of them were forced to accept the teachings of the Asharites.

Beliefs
Many of the views of the Jahmites are seen as heretical by Sunnis, and sometimes even resulted in their expulsion from Islamic society in general. Thus, the Jahmites deny all the names and attributes of Allah, faith in which is an important part of the religious doctrine of orthodox Muslims. On the issue of interpreting the concept of “Iman,” the jahmits are similar to the Murjites, and argue that faith is only knowledge of Allah, and unbelief is ignorance about him. They also stated that heaven and hell would disappear sooner or later, which according to mainstream muslim view contradicts both the Qur'an and the Sunnah of the Prophet Muhammad.

In the matter of predestination, the Jahmites adhere to the fact that a person does not have free will and is forced into their actions. And on the question of the nature of Allah, the Jahmites are pantheists and say that he is everywhere and lives in all creatures. In addition, they deny the possibility of righteous Muslims seeing Allah in paradise.

Critique of Jahmi
Since the advent of Jahmism, this tendency has been the subject of criticism by many prominent representatives of orthodox Islam. Throughout Islamic history, numerous refutations of the teachings of the jahmites appeared, the authors of which were Sunni theologians, including Ahmad ibn Hanbal, Ibn Qutayba and Ibn Qayyim al-Jawziyya. Other critics of the Jahmites included Abu Hamid al-Ghazali, Ibn Hajar al-Asqalani and Ibn Taymiyyah. Yasir Qadhi wrote a lengthy dissertation (in Arabic only) during his time in Madinah which is entitled "The Theological Opinions of Jahm b. Ṣafwān and Their Effects on the Other Islamic Sects."

References

Islamic branches